The Tundra Mine is a gold mine that operated in the Northwest Territories, Canada between 1962 and 1968, producing 104,476 troy ounces (3250 kg) of gold from 187,714 tons of ore. Indian and Northern Affairs Canada has a project to remediate the Tundra Mine site under their Northern Contaminants Program, funded by the Canadian Federal Contaminated Sites Action Plan.

External links
Tundra Mine: Indian and Northern Affairs Canada

Gold mines in the Northwest Territories
Former mines in Canada